Reesink is a Dutch surname. Notable people with the surname include:

Diogo Reesink (1934–2019), Brazilian-Dutch Roman Catholic bishop
Ger Reesink, Dutch linguist
Jaap Reesink (born 1946), Dutch rower

Dutch-language surnames